This is a list of notable computer users' groups, categorized by interest.

General
 Chaos Computer Club
 Computer Measurement Group (CMG)
 ComputerTown UK
 Homebrew Computer Club
 Port7Alliance

Hardware platforms
 Adamcon (Coleco Adam user group)
 Toronto PET Users Group (TPUG)
 SHARE
 Macintosh User Groups in the UK
 DUsers, the first Macintosh users group, based at Drexel University
 IIUG International Informix Users Group
 COMMON for Power Systems (IBM i, AS/400, iSeries, System i, AIX and Linux) users in North America.

Linux
 Bangalore Linux User Group
 Beijing GNU/Linux User Group
 Carson City Linux Users Group
 Linux Users' Group of Davis
 ILUG-Delhi
 Lanka Linux User Group
 Linux Australia
 Linux Users of Victoria
 LinuxChix
 Loco team
 NYLUG
 Portland Linux/Unix Group
 RLUG
 SEUL
 Southern California Linux Expo

Programming languages
 Perl Mongers
 Z User Group

Markup languages
 TeX Users Group
 Deutschsprachige Anwendervereinigung TeX

Lists of organizations
 
Computing-related lists